The Mount Baker–Snoqualmie National Forest in Washington is a National Forest extending more than  along the western slopes of the Cascade Range from the Canada–US border to the northern boundary of Mount Rainier National Park. Administered by the United States Forest Service, the forest is headquartered in Everett. There are local ranger district offices in North Bend and Skykomish.

History 
It became a national forest on March 4, 1907, and was renamed Mount Baker National Forest on January 21, 1924. Snoqualmie National Forest was established from land in Washington NF on 1 July 1908 with 961,120 acres (3,889.52 km2). A part of Rainier National Forest was added on October 19, 1933. The two were administratively combined in 1974.

The 1935 version of The Call of the Wild with Clark Gable, Loretta Young  and Jack Oakie was filmed on location in Mount Baker National Forest because Twentieth Century Pictures felt it was remote enough to guarantee lack of interruption from skiers and other forest visitors. Paramount Pictures later also filmed The Barrier at Mount Baker Lodge.

Visitation
The Mount Baker–Snoqualmie National Forest covers (in descending order of forestland area) portions of Snohomish, Whatcom, Skagit, King, Pierce, and Kittitas counties. The forest consists of four ranger districts. The following are listed geographically from north to south: the Mount Baker District has two ranger stations located in Glacier and Sedro-Woolley; the Darrington Ranger District has two ranger stations located in Darrington and Verlot; the Skykomish Ranger District has one ranger station located in Skykomish; and the Snoqualmie Ranger District has two ranger stations located in North Bend and Enumclaw.

Together with the other central Puget Sound counties, 62% (3.63 million people) of the state's population lives within a  drive of the forest. Another 1.5 million in the Vancouver metropolitan area are also within easy reach of the northern part of the forest. The large population factor, coupled with easy road access, makes the Mount Baker–Snoqualmie National Forest the most visited national forest in the country.

Geography

Mountains
The Mount Baker–Snoqualmie National Forest contains many scenic and historical points of interest. Two tall volcanoes, Mount Baker and Glacier Peak, tower thousands of feet above the adjacent ridges.

Glaciers
The forest is home to more glaciers and snow fields than any other national forest outside Alaska. , the largest glaciers—with surface areas greater than —are:
 Mount Baker
 Roosevelt
 Mazama
 Park
 Boulder
 Easton
 Deming
 Coleman
 Sentinel Peak
 South Cascade Glacier
 Glacier Peak
 Suiattle
 Honeycomb
 White Chuck
The number of glaciers in the forest has decreased from 295 in 1971 to fewer than 287 in 1998. This is a part of the global phenomenon of glacier retreat. Forest glaciers have lost between 20 and 40% of their volume between 1984 and 2006. This is due to continued warm conditions and negative mass balance. White Chuck Glacier (Glacier Peak) is no longer on the list of large glaciers, above. With the shrinking of the glaciers, summer glacial runoff has been reduced by 65 to 80%. This reduces streamflow and sediment and increases water temperature. Salmon and many other species are adversely affected by such changes.

Conservation
The north and east portions of the forest are exceptionally rugged and scenic. In 1968, part of the forest was transferred to the National Park Service to be within North Cascades National Park. In addition, Congressional action since 1964 has established the following wilderness areas, which comprise —almost half of the forest's area:
 Alpine Lakes Wilderness (mostly in Wenatchee NF)
 Boulder River Wilderness
 Clearwater Wilderness
 Glacier Peak Wilderness (mostly in Wenatchee NF)
 Henry M. Jackson Wilderness (partly in Wenatchee NF)
 Mount Baker Wilderness
 Noisy-Diobsud Wilderness
 Norse Peak Wilderness
 Pasayten Wilderness (mostly in Okanogan NF)
 Wild Sky Wilderness
These pristine areas provide clean water, solitude, and permanent protection to old-growth forests across 42% of the Mount Baker–Snoqualmie National Forest.

Congress also established the Skagit Wild and Scenic River System in 1978. Its  of rivers on the Skagit, Cascade, Sauk, and Suiattle rivers provide important wildlife habitat and recreation. The Skagit River System is home to one of the largest winter populations of bald eagles in the United States.

The Mount Baker–Snoqualmie National Forest encompasses much of the North Cascades ecoregion, a Level III North American Ecoregion. It includes the following level IV ecoregions:
 Western Hemlock Ecoregion
 Silver Fir Ecoregion
 Subalpine Mountain Hemlock Ecoregion
 Alpine Ecoregion

References

External links

 Official website
 The Death of a Glacier Retreat of the White Chuck Glacier''.

 
National Forests of Washington (state)
North Cascades of Washington (state)
Protected areas of King County, Washington
Protected areas of Kittitas County, Washington
Protected areas of Pierce County, Washington
Protected areas of Skagit County, Washington
Protected areas of Snohomish County, Washington
Protected areas of Whatcom County, Washington
Protected areas established in 1974
1974 establishments in Washington (state)